Flying with Music is a 1942 American musical film directed by George Archainbaud and written by Louis S. Kaye and M. Coates Webster. The film stars Marjorie Woodworth, George Givot, William Marshall, Edward Gargan, Jerry Bergen and Norma Varden. The film was released on May 22, 1942, by United Artists.

Plot

Cast  
 Marjorie Woodworth as Ann Andrews
 George Givot as Harry Bernard
 William Marshall as Pilot Don Terry
 Edward Gargan as Joe
 Jerry Bergen as Wilbur
 Norma Varden as Miss Mullens
 Claudia Drake as Jill Parker
 Jane Kean as Bobbie
 Jayne Hazard as Jane
 Dorothy Kelly as Mary

References

External links 
 

1942 films
American black-and-white films
Films directed by George Archainbaud
United Artists films
1940s musical drama films
American musical drama films
1942 drama films
Films scored by Edward Ward (composer)
1940s English-language films
1940s American films